Kavindra Parameshwar was a medieval Bengali poet. He wrote the first Bengali translation of Mahabharata.

Biography
Parameshwar was born Parameshwar Das in Balanda, Saptagram, Hooghly. He was given the titile Kavindra, which means prime among the poets, for his literary contributions. Gunaraj, his father, was a Zamindar and an influential local leader.

Parameshwar was the court poet of Bengal Sultanate governor Paragal Khan. At the request of Paragal Khan, he wrote an abridged version of the Mahabharata in Bengali. It is believed to be the first Bengali version of the Mahabharata (translate from Sanskrit). He wrote it during 1519-1519. His version is called Kavindra-Mahabharata.

References

16th-century Bengali poets
People from Hooghly district
Bengali male poets
Bengali-language poets